Amanita pantherina, also known as the panther cap, false blusher, and the panther amanita due to its similarity to the true blusher (Amanita rubescens), is a species of fungus found in Europe and Western Asia.

Description

Cap: 5–18 cm wide, hemispheric at first, then convex to plano-convex, deep brown to hazel-brown to pale ochraceous brown, densely distributed warts that are pure white to sordid cream, minutely verruculose, floccose, easily removable. Viscid when wet, with a short striate margin. The flesh is white, unchanging when injured.
Gills: adnexed to free, close to crowded, white becoming greyish, truncate.
Spores: white in deposit, smooth, broadly ellipsoid to ellipsoid to elongate, inamyloid, infrequently globose. 8–14 x 6–10 µm.
Stipe: 5–15 cm long × .6–3 cm wide, subcylindric, somewhat narrowing upward, white, becoming slightly tannish in age, stuffed then hollow, finely floccose becoming smooth above the ring, and with small appressed squamules or creamy floccose material below. The volva is white, becoming grey with age, forming one or sometimes two narrow hoop-like rings just above the bulbous base. The flesh is white, unchanging when injured.
Odour: Unpleasant or like raw potatoes

Other than the brownish cap with white warts, distinguishing features of Amanita pantherina include the collar-like roll of volval tissue at the top of the basal bulb, and the elliptical, inamyloid spores.
Contrary to the Amanita rubescens the panther cap  does not color red/pink ("blush") when the flesh is damaged, hence its name "false blusher". This is a key feature in differentiating both species.

Habitat and distribution
The panther cap is an uncommon mushroom, found in both deciduous, especially beech and, less frequently, coniferous woodland and rarely meadows throughout Europe, western Asia in late summer and autumn. It has also been recorded from South Africa, where it is thought to have been accidentally introduced with trees imported from Europe, Asia and on Vancouver Island, in British Columbia, Canada. It is common in urban areas from winter to spring.

It is an ectomycorrhizal fungus, living in root symbiosis with a tree, deriving photosynthesised nutrients from it and providing soil nutrients in return.

Biochemistry and toxicity

A. pantherina contains the psychoactive compounds ibotenic acid and muscimol, two psychoactive constituents which can cause effects such as hallucinations, synaesthesia, euphoria, dysphoria and retrograde amnesia. The effects of muscimol and ibotenic acid most closely resemble that of a Z drug, like Ambien at high doses, and not a classical psychedelic, e.g. psilocybin. 

A. pantherina is also toxic; if consumed fresh, it may not be fatal to humans, it can cause diarrhea, vomiting, and hyperhidrosis, which can lead to severe dehydration. 

A. pantherina is used as an entheogen much less often than its much more distinguishable relative Amanita muscaria, largely due to being less recognizable and far more potent, containing a higher concentration of ibotenic acid. While ibotenic acid is mostly broken down into the body to muscimol, what remains of the ibotenic acid is believed to cause the majority of dysphoric effects of consuming psychedelic Amanita species. Ibotenic acid is also a scientifically important neurotoxin used in lab research as a brain-lesioning agent in mice.

As with other wild-growing mushrooms, the ratio of ibotenic acid to muscimol depends on countless external factors, including: season, age, and habitat - and percentages will naturally vary from mushroom-to-mushroom — with dark brown A. pantherina specimens having a greater concentration of ibotenic acid.

A. pantherina var. pantherinoides is considered inedible and possibly poisonous. Varieties multisquamosa and velatipes are considered poisonous.

Legal status

A. muscaria and A. pantherina are illegal to buy, sell, or possess in the Netherlands since December 2008. Possession of amounts larger than 0.5 g dried or 5 g fresh lead to a criminal charge.

See also

Amanita muscaria
List of Amanita species

Gallery

References

External links

 Webpages on Amanita species by Tulloss and Yang Zhuliang
 Amanita on erowid.org
 Aminita muscaria, Amanita pantherina and others (Group PIM G026) by IPCS INCHEM

pantherina
Fungi of Asia
Fungi of Europe
Poisonous fungi
Psychoactive fungi
Fungi described in 1815
Taxa named by Augustin Pyramus de Candolle